May Morning  is a 1970 Italian thriller-drama film co-written and directed by Ugo Liberatore.

Plot    
Three young students have different experiences (including sexual) at Oxford University in England.

Cast 

 Jane Birkin as Flora Finlake
 Alessio Orano  as Valerio Montelli
 John Steiner as  Rodrick Rodney Stanton
 Rossella Falk as  Mrs. Finlake 
  Micaela Pignatelli  as  Amanda
 Ian Sinclair as  Professor Finlake

See also   
 List of Italian films of 1970

References

External links

 

1970 films
Italian thriller drama films
1970s thriller drama films
English-language Italian films
Films set in Oxford
Films scored by Armando Trovajoli
1970 drama films
1970s English-language films
1970s Italian films